One Bright Day is a 1958 Australian television play. It aired on the ABC and was directed by Ray Menmuir. It aired as part of Monday Night Theatre.

It was based on a US TV play by American Sidmund Miller. Alan Seymour adapted it.

Plot
Julian Prescott is the president of a large chemical company. His business is almost ruined by his ambitious general manager, George Lawrence, who in the president's absence has changed the formula of a popular patent medicine produced by the company. The president is faced with a lawsuit by a man who claims the new formula drug caused the death of his son. The president's daughter Margot becomes involved.

Cast
Patricia Kerr as Margot Prescott
Joe McCormick as Julian Prescott
Kevin Sanders as George Lawrence, general manager
Eric Gormley as Fred Newberry, an executive
Julian Flett as a lawyer
Georgie Sterling
Nigel Lovell
Eve Hardwick
Carlotta Kalmar
Laurier Lange
John Llewellyn
Al Thomas

Production
The original play had been performed on stage in Melbourne in 1957.

It was the first TV play for many of the cast.

Reception
The TV critic for the Sydney Morning Herald thought that "neither the writing nor the acting... allowed deep or gripping investigation of the play ' s essential issue whether it is better to be callous and stay rich, or to be decent and plunge down to poverty.... For the most part, the characters were being run by the plot, instead of themselves begetting the plot—which is mere yarn-spinning, and not drama."

See also
List of live television plays broadcast on Australian Broadcasting Corporation (1950s)

References

External links

Australian television films
1950s Australian television plays